Wolseong-dong may refer to

Wolseong-dong, Iksan
Wolseong-dong, Gyeongju
Wolseong-dong, Gwangju
Wolseong-dong, Daegu